S-equivalence is an equivalence relation on the families of semistable vector bundles on an algebraic curve.

Definition 
Let X be a projective curve over an algebraically closed field k. A vector bundle on X can be considered as a locally free sheaf. Every semistable locally free E on X admits a Jordan-Hölder filtration with stable subquotients, i.e.

Although the Jordan-Hölder filtration is not unique, the subquotients are, which means that  is unique up to isomorphism.

Two semistable locally free sheaves E and F on X are S-equivalent if gr E ≅ gr F.

Algebraic curves
Vector bundles
Equivalence (mathematics)